Sand in Your Shoes is a studio album by English singer-songwriter Ralph McTell. It was released in the UK in 1995 by Transatlantic Records and received a US release in 1998 through Red House Records.

Critical reception

Upon its release, Michael Ruby of No Depression commented, "Standout tracks here, such as 'Tous Les Animaux Sont Tristes', 'Peppers and Tomatoes' and 'I Don't Think About You', find McTell doing what he does best: telling unique stories from unique viewpoints." Clark Collis of The Daily Telegraph wrote, "Few easy singalongs emerge, but the album offers further evidence of McTell's reflective strengths. Three decades after his 'Streets of London', a song called 'Care in the Community' highlights one of the social issues troubling him now." William Ruhlmann of AllMusic described the album as a "full, expansive collection of songs that makes a worthy addition to the singer/songwriter's catalog". He added, "Sand in Your Shoes finds McTell over 50 and reflecting philosophically on the passage of time, the approach of death, and several social concerns. The overall tone of the collection is elegiac, the songs full of loss and regret."

Track listing

Personnel
 Ralph McTell - vocals, guitar, harmonica, keyboards
 Maartin Allcock - accordion, arranger, bouz, drums, guitars, bass, keyboards, mandolin, uillean pipes, background vocals 
 Alun Davies - guitar
 Jerry Donahue - electric guitar
  - piano, arranger
 Chris Leslie - fiddle, viola, violin, violone
 Frank Gallagher - fiddle, whistle
 Philip Todd - clarinet, saxophone
 Guy Barker - trumpet
 Chris Laurence, Dave Pegg - bass
 Gerry Conway, Ralph Salmins - drums
 Patric Molard - sampling
 Mary Hopkin - vocals
 Leah May, Phil Beer, Rebecca Moncur, Steve Knightley - background vocals

Production
 Ralph McTell, Maartin Allcock - producers
 Mark Frith, Tim Matyear, Mark Tucker - engineers
 Nick Watson - mastering

Other
 Hugh Gilmour, Eric Peltoniemi - design
 David Lieberman, Mike Smallcombe - photography

References

1995 albums
Ralph McTell albums
Transatlantic Records albums
Red House Records albums